False Colors is a 1943 American Western film directed by George Archainbaud and written by Morton Grant, Michael Wilson and Norman Houston. The film stars William Boyd, Andy Clyde, Jimmy Rogers, Douglass Dumbrille, Tom Seidel, Claudia Drake and Robert Mitchum. The film was released on November 5, 1943, by United Artists.

Plot
A Bar 20 cowboy is killed soon after inheriting a ranch. Hopalong Cassidy goes to look over the land and help the murdered man’s sister. Hoppy discovers that a crooked banker is out to steal the ranch.

Cast 
William Boyd as Hopalong Cassidy
Andy Clyde as California Carlson
Jimmy Rogers as Jimmy Rogers
Douglass Dumbrille as Mark Foster
Tom Seidel as Bud Lawton / Kit Moyer
Claudia Drake as Faith Lawton
Robert Mitchum as Henchman Rip Austin 
Glenn Strange as Henchman Sonora
Pierce Lyden as Henchman Lefty
Roy Barcroft as Sheriff Clem Martin

References

External links 
 

1943 films
Hopalong Cassidy films
American black-and-white films
Films directed by George Archainbaud
United Artists films
American Western (genre) films
1943 Western (genre) films
Films scored by Paul Sawtell
1940s English-language films
1940s American films